Mozah is a Q-Max LNG carrier operated by Qatargas II. The vessel was built in 2008 by Samsung Heavy Industries and is tied with her sister ships for the largest LNG carrier in the world. The vessel is part of a contract for 14 same-size ships with maximum particulars to berth at Ras Laffan terminal in Qatar.

The ship is named after Sheikha Moza bint Nasser, wife of Sheikh Hamad bin Khalifa Al Thani who was then the Emir of Qatar.

Design 
The large size and capacity form her efficiency and profitability.

Engineering 
Mozah is driven by 2 MAN B&W 7S70ME-C two-stroke low speed diesel engines, electronically controlled.

Registry 
Mozah is owned and operated by Qatargas 2. The vessel has MMSI 538003212, IMO number 9337755 and call sign V7PD7.

Operations 
Mozah carried the 10,000th LNG cargo load from Qatar, on May 9, 2016.

It is operated by Nakilat.

See also 
 LNG carrier

References 

LNG tankers
Ships built by Samsung Heavy Industries
2007 ships